Simone Karpani (born 16 June 1997) is an Australian professional rugby league footballer who currently plays for the Newcastle Knights in the NRL Women's Premiership. She previously played for the Sydney Roosters.

Background
Born in Logan, Queensland, Karpani played her junior rugby league in Adelaide, South Australia.

She is the sister of Australian Wallaroos rugby union representative Asoiva Karpani.

Playing career

Early years
In 2017, Karpani represented the Women's All Stars side against the Indigenous Women's All Stars. Soon after, she played for the Cronulla-Sutherland Sharks in the Cronulla Sharks Women's Series. In 2019, she joined the Wests Tigers in the NSWRL Women's Premiership. In 2021, she joined the Central Coast Roosters.

2022
Karpani joined the Sydney Roosters NRLW squad in 2022. In round 1 of the delayed 2021 NRL Women's season, she made her NRLW debut for the Roosters against the Brisbane Broncos. She played in the Roosters' 2021 Grand Final win over the St. George Illawarra Dragons.

In June, she signed with the Newcastle Knights for the 2022 season. She made her club debut for the Knights in round 1 of the 2022 NRLW season against the Brisbane Broncos.

On 2 October, Karpani played in the Knights' 2022 NRLW Grand Final win over the Parramatta Eels.

References

External links
Newcastle Knights profile
Sydney Roosters profile

1997 births
Australian female rugby league players
Australian sportspeople of Tongan descent
Sydney Roosters (NRLW) players
Newcastle Knights (NRLW) players
Rugby league locks
Living people